Clathromangelia libyca is an extinct species of sea snail, a marine gastropod mollusk in the family Raphitomidae.

Description

Distribution
Fossils of this extinct species were found in Eocene strata in Egypt.

References

 Cuvillier (J.), 1933 - Nouvelle contribution à la paléontologie du nummulitique égyptien. Mémoires de l'Institut d'Égypte, t. 22, p. 1-76

libyca
Gastropods described in 1933